Sugai (written: 菅井 or 須貝) is a Japanese surname. Notable people with the surname include:

, Japanese singer, composer and arranger
, Japanese judoka
, Japanese actor
, Japanese actress
, Japanese painter and printmaker
, Japanese ballet dancer
, Japanese footballer
, Japanese golfer
, Japanese dermatologist
, Japanese footballer
, Japanese shogi player
, Japanese long jumper
, Japanese idol singer

Japanese-language surnames